Torodora osamensis is a moth in the family Lecithoceridae. It was described by Kyu-Tek Park in 2013. It is found in Cambodia.

References

Moths described in 2013
Torodora